Wikispeed is an automotive manufacturer that produces modular design cars. Wikispeed competed in the Progressive Automotive X Prize competition in 2010. The car debuted at the North American International Auto Show (NAIAS) in Detroit, Michigan in January 2011.

Wikispeed was founded by Joe Justice and is headquartered in Seattle, Washington. In 2011, Justice gave a TEDx talk explaining the management style implemented by the Wikispeed team.

Wikispeed innovates by applying scrum development techniques borrowed from the software world. They use open source tools and lean management methods to improve their productivity.

On January 6, 2015, Wikispeed announced that they have been unable to create a working engine module since their second model and called on the community for help.  On February 15, 2015, Wikispeed announced an update that they have produced another working engine module.

See also 
 Open-source car
 Electric vehicle
 Open hardware

References

External links

Open hardware vehicles
Modular design
Electric vehicle manufacturers of the United States
Car manufacturers of the United States